World Assembly of Youth is a documentary film created in 1952 for the US State Department. It is believed to be lost but evidence for it was discovered on an early résumé sent by Stanley Kubrick to veteran New York film critic Theodore Huff in February 1953. In the résumé and covering letter, Kubrick lists working on this film alongside his other documentaries, The Seafarers, Day of the Fight, and Flying Padre. The résumé was uncovered by John Baxter, while doing research for his own book, Stanley Kubrick: A Biography.

Baxter's research found that the film was sponsored by the United States Department of State and was one of a series of films intended to mobilize college-aged youngsters to carry out socially worthy projects. This initiative ultimately led to the formation of the Peace Corps.

Kubrick's actual role in the film is uncertain. Following the publication of Baxter's book, some readers misinterpreted the story as to believe there was an undiscovered film directed by Stanley Kubrick; this can be seen in myriad internet pages that credit Kubrick as director of World Assembly of Youth. Baxter himself has stated that his knowledge of Kubrick's involvement in this film is no more than the reference in his letter to Ted Huff. Baxter speculates that Kubrick may have worked on the project as a cameraman or even simply a stills photographer.

References

Lost American films
Sponsored films
American documentary films
Stanley Kubrick
1952 films
1952 documentary films
1950s English-language films
1950s American films